Sanaa Atabrour (born February 28, 1989 in Khouribga)  is a Moroccan taekwondo practitioner.

Sanaa won the bronze medal in the women's flyweight class at the 2011 World Taekwondo Championships held in Gyeongju. Sanaa qualified for the 2012 Summer Olympics after winning the gold medal in the women's 49 kg class at the WTF African Qualification Tournament for the 2012 London Olympic Games held in Cairo.  She beat Catherine Kang 4-0 in the final. In 2012 she competed in the Women's 49 kg competition, but was defeated in the first round.

References

External links

1989 births
Moroccan female taekwondo practitioners
Olympic taekwondo practitioners of Morocco
Taekwondo practitioners at the 2012 Summer Olympics
Living people
People from Khouribga
World Taekwondo Championships medalists
20th-century Moroccan women
21st-century Moroccan women